Songs We Didn't Write is Ghoti Hook's third CD on Tooth & Nail Records.  A cover album, it contains Ghoti Hook versions of songs both from secular and Christian music.

Track listing 
 I Love Rock 'n' Roll (by Joan Jett and the Blackhearts)
 Earth Angel (originally by The Penguins)
 True Faith (originally by New Order)
 Just What I Needed (originally by The Cars)
 Friends (originally by Michael W. Smith)
 Acquiesce (originally by Stavesacre)
 I See Red (originally by X)
 Walking On Sunshine (originally by Katrina and the Waves)
 The Guitar Song (originally by Dead Milkmen)
 Hey Nonny Nonny (originally by Violent Femmes)
 On The Road Again (originally by Willie Nelson)
 Where Is My Mind? (originally by The Pixies)
 Burning Love (originally by Elvis Presley)
 The Invisible Man (originally by The Vindictives)
 Laugh Track

Notes and references

Ghoti Hook albums
Tooth & Nail Records albums
1999 albums